Frances Elliott Mann Hall (October 6, 1853 in Yarmouth, Maine – died February 6, 1935) was one of the five founders of Sigma Kappa sorority.

Colby College, in Waterville, Maine, became the first New England college to admit women along with men. Mary Caffrey Low became the first female student at Colby, and for two years remained the only one. Eventually she was joined by four other women, and along with Elizabeth Gorham Hoag, Ida Fuller, Hall and Louise Helen Coburn, Low created the Sigma Kappa sorority at Colby on November 9, 1874.

Hall is the only member of Sigma Kappa to also be a member of the Order of the Eastern Star.

Being the only women in the college, the five of them found themselves together frequently. In 1873–74, the five young women decided to form a literary and social society. They were instructed by the college administration that they would need to present a constitution and bylaws with a petition requesting permission to form Sigma Kappa Sorority.

They began work during that year and on November 9, 1874, the five young women received a letter from the faculty approving their petition. They sought for and received permission to form a sorority with the intent for the organization to become national.

Frances Hall was a high school teacher in Rockport, Massachusetts prior to entering Colby College. She felt she needed better training for her profession. Hall was slightly older than the other women but was still in her early 20s.

Having to go to chapel to get a mark, Hall was late one day and had to wait for all the men to come out. It was an embarrassing moment. Hall said afterwards, all she saw was the floor, but all one young man, George Washington Hall, saw was Frances. When his friends asked him what ailed him, he replied, "I've just seen my wife." Frances had to leave college her junior year, as Ida Fuller did also, because of astigmatic headaches. She married George, and they went teaching together. Hall was the first Sigma Kappa to be married.

Frances attended the 1928 Convention in Washington, D.C. and the Saranac Convention in 1933. At Saranac, she was a faithful attendant at all functions, even the Mission program which began at midnight.

Reportedly, her last message before her death in 1935   was, "Take my love to all the chapters. God bless them."

References

External links
 Sigma Kappa Sorority official site

1853 births
1935 deaths
Colby College alumni
People from Rockport, Massachusetts
Sigma Kappa founders